Witness is the second studio album by American metalcore band Blessthefall. It was released on October 6, 2009, through Fearless Records. It is the band's first album with Beau Bokan on lead vocals and final album with original guitarist Mike Frisby. The album was co-produced with There for Tomorrow drummer, Christopher Kamrada. This album includes a post-metal entrance, "2.0", and some songs without any screams or death growls.

The song "God Wears Gucci" was released in MySpace and the iTunes Store on Tuesday, August 11, 2009, and is the third song released off the album, along with "To Hell & Back" and "We'll Sleep When We're Dead", although these were demonstrations to the album versions. On September 9 the band uploaded a new track to Myspace: "What's Left of Me". The entire album was streaming on their MySpace page until October 6, 2009. The album was released for sale in the US on October 6, 2009, with a European release date of the October 26 scheduled, ahead of their first ever European headline tour in support of the album. Witness sold 11,000 copies in its first week, debuting at No. 56 on Billboard 200 and No. 6 on the Top Independent Albums chart.

The song "Hey Baby, Here's That Song You Wanted" has been released as downloadable content for Rock Band on the Xbox 360.
The song "To Hell & Back" was included on the soundtrack to Ubisoft's Splinter Cell: Conviction. The song and the game trailer was released around the start of April 2010.
The songs "God Wears Gucci" and "To Hell & Back" are downloadable tracks in the iOS game Tap Tap Revenge 4.

Track listing

Personnel 
Blessthefall
 Beau Bokan – clean vocals
 Eric Lambert – lead guitar, backing vocals
 Mike Frisby – rhythm guitar
 Jared Warth – bass guitar, unclean vocals
 Matt Traynor – drums, percussion

Production
 Michael "Elvis" Baskette – mixing, production
 Dave Holdredge – engineer, mixing
 Jef Moll - digital editing

Charts

References

2009 albums
Blessthefall albums
Albums produced by Michael Baskette
Fearless Records albums